Pardomima distortana is a moth of the family Crambidae. It is found in Cameroon, the Democratic Republic of Congo (Equateur), Equatorial Guinea, Gabon, Ghana, Ivory Coast, Nigeria and Sierra Leone.

References

Moths described in 1913
Spilomelinae